Renata Kučerová (born 15 July 1979) is a former Czech tennis player.

Kučerová won two singles and five doubles titles on the ITF tour in her career. On 31 January 2000, she reached her best singles ranking of world number 177. On 4 March 2002, she peaked at world number 284 in the doubles rankings.

ITF finals (7–9)

Singles (2–2)

Doubles (5–7)

References 
 
 

1979 births
Living people
Czech female tennis players
20th-century Czech women